David Hess (1936–2011) was an American actor and songwriter.

David Hess may also refer to:
David Hess (baseball) (born 1993), professional baseball pitcher
David Hess (painter) (1770–1843), Swiss writer, caricaturist, and politician
David Hess (politician) (born 1942), Republican member of the New Hampshire House of Representatives
David M. Hess, a New York City landlord; see Hess triangle